Prezzo ("price" in Italian) is a restaurant chain serving mostly Italian cuisine in the United Kingdom and Ireland. The first restaurant opened on New Oxford Street, London in November 2000.  there were more than 180 branches across the country, following many closures in 2018. It is part of Prezzo Holdings. The chain is currently owned by Cain International.

History

The first Prezzo restaurant was opened in central London by Jonathan Kaye, the company's chief executive, in 2000.  there were more than 180 branches in the UK. Prezzo opened its first restaurant in Ireland in February 2016. Prezzo commonly converts old buildings of architectural value from their old purposes into Prezzo restaurants; examples include an old cinema in Beaconsfield, Buckinghamshire.

The first owner of the Prezzo business was Jonathan Kaye In 2008 Jonathan hired cousins Adam Kaye and Samuel Kaye (sons of Philip Kaye) to join Prezzo plc's board of directors. Adam and Samuel founded Ask (restaurant) and Zizzi.

Prezzo donates 25p of the profits raised from sales of their Tropicana Pizza to the children's charity Fight for Life.

In 2011 Aldo Zilli designed four pizzas which were added to the Prezzo menu under the name "V.I.Pizzas".

Private equity firm TPG took over the Prezzo business in 2015 when Jonathan Kaye moved to a non-executive role. In June 2015, Dirk Eller was appointed interim chief executive. Jon Hendry-Pickup joined Prezzo as chief executive in July 2016.

In February 2018, Prezzo confirmed it planned to close 100 of its 300 restaurants and secure a company voluntary arrangement as part of a rescue plan for the chain. On 2 March 2018 they announced that they would close 94 branches, including all 33 outlets of Chimichanga.

Financial history
In February 2006, when Prezzo owned 73 restaurants, it initiated a major expansion of the business by dropping the price per share. This successfully raised £7.125 million to fund further expansion. Net cash at the half-year was £9.4 million. During the first six months of 2006 Prezzo opened 12 new restaurants. In the year ending December 2006,  Prezzo showed a 45% growth in turnover to £54.2m and pre-tax profit grew from £6.1m the year before to £8.7m. In April 2008 Prezzo saw sales grow again to £70.1m and pre-tax profit rose 25% to £13.6m.

The chain continued to grow steadily, reporting a 17% rise in profits to £7.3million (GBP) in September 2011. In 2011 the company continued to expand into new restaurant locations, reportedly aiming for a 10% increase in restaurant numbers in 2012.

Prezzo is currently under offer to The Cain group and the Prezzo management team. This has alarmed some investors and landlords though there is no evidence to suggest any manipulation of the business has occurred.

Landlords are hoping that they will soon start receiving full rents instead of half rents. Difficult times lie ahead for these business models but the Cain Group believe that Prezzo will rise again with the proper management: this has led to some commentators questioning the current management team staying on.

See also
 List of Italian restaurants

References

External links
 Prezzo Restaurants official website
 Prezzo PLC official website
 

Restaurants established in 2000
Pizza chains of the United Kingdom
Restaurant groups in the United Kingdom
Italian restaurants
2000 establishments in England